The 2015 Progressive Conservative Party of Ontario leadership election was held on May 9, 2015, as a result of the resignation of Ontario Progressive Conservative leader Tim Hudak following the provincial election on June 12, 2014, his second loss in a row as party leader. Patrick Brown won the leadership with 61.8% of votes allocated, defeating Christine Elliott who had 38.2%.

Rules and procedure
The party's 76,587 members were eligible to cast votes by preferential ballot. The vote will be weighted so that each of the province's 107 ridings that has more than 100 votes cast are allocated 100 electoral votes;  ridings in which fewer than 100 party members vote will not be weighted, but will instead have the votes counted as individual votes. If at least 100 members votes in each riding the number of electoral college votes needed to win will be 5,351. The registration fee was $75,000 plus a refundable deposit of $25,000 and the spending limit was $1.25 million. 20% of money raised by candidates after the first $100,000 will be transferred to the PC Ontario Fund. The lowest ranked candidate will be dropped from the next round as ballots are counted, and the first candidate to get 50 per cent of the votes will be declared the new leader.

Timeline
June 12, 2014: General election results in the incumbent Liberals, led by Kathleen Wynne, being re-elected with a majority government and the Progressive Conservatives losing 9 seats. Party leader Tim Hudak announces his intention to resign as leader following the selection of his successor.
June 16, 2014: Progressive Conservative caucus meets with a majority of MPPs asking Hudak to resign immediately.
June 18, 2014: Hudak announces to the Progressive Conservative caucus that he will resign effective July 2, 2014.
June 25, 2014: Christine Elliott announces her bid for the leadership of the Ontario PC Party.
July 2, 2014: Ontario legislature convenes; Hudak's resignation will take effect; Progressive Conservative caucus chooses Jim Wilson as interim leader.
July 5, 2014: The Progressive Conservative executive met to discuss the leadership and appointed a committee to consult the party membership and then draft recommendations for leadership campaign rules and propose a date for the election.
Early August 2014: Party committee reports back to the executive with its proposals.
August 9, 2014: Party executive announces that the leadership election will occur no earlier than April 1, 2015 and no later than May 31, 2015. The planning committee is given an additional six weeks to consult with party members on the rules of the election.
September 17, 2014: Monte McNaughton declares his candidacy.
September 21, 2014: Planning committee reports back to executive.
September 24, 2014: Vic Fedeli declares his candidacy.
September 28, 2014: Patrick Brown declares his candidacy.
October 6, 2014: Lisa MacLeod declares her candidacy.
November 8, 2014: Official campaign period begins.
November 24, 2014: All-candidates debate in Sudbury.
January 26, 2015: All-candidates debate in London.
January 30, 2015 at 12 pm: Deadline for candidates to file nomination papers and pay first installment of $75,000 registration fee and $25,000 deposit.
February 4, 2015: Fedeli withdraws from contest.
February 6, 2015: MacLeod withdraws; final non-refundable $50,000 installment of candidate entry fee is due.
February 11, 2015: All-candidates debate in Ottawa.
February 28, 2015: Date by which one must become a member of the party and be eligible to vote in the leadership election.
April 9, 2015: McNaughton withdraws; endorses Brown.
May 1, 2015: Televised debate on TVO in Toronto
May 3 & 7, 2015: Members cast preferential ballot for leader.
May 8–9, 2015: Ballots counted. 
May 9, 2015: Results announced, riding by riding, between 10 am and noon at the Toronto Congress Centre.

Interim leadership
The following MPPs stood in the July 2, 2014, election by caucus to be interim leader of the party until the leadership election for a permanent leader is held:
Randy Hillier (Lanark—Frontenac—Lennox and Addington), MPP since 2007, variously Opposition Critic for Labour, Municipal Affairs and Housing, Rural Affairs, and Northern Development, Mines and Forestry.
Jim Wilson (Simcoe—Grey), MPP since 1990, Opposition House Leader (2011–2014), previously Minister of Health (1995–1997), Minister of Energy, Science & Technology (1997–2002), Minister of Northern Development and Mines (2002–2003), Minister of Environment (2003).
John Yakabuski (Renfrew—Nipissing—Pembroke), MPP since 2003, has served as Chief Opposition Whip (2011–2014), Opposition House Leader (2010–2011) and variously Opposition Critic for Community Safety and Energy.

Jim Wilson was elected by caucus to be interim leader and also assumed the position of Leader of the Opposition. Vote totals were not released.

Declared candidates

Patrick Brown

Background
Federal Conservative Party MP for Barrie (2006–2015), Barrie City Councillor (2000–2006), President of the Progressive Conservative Youth Federation (PCYF) (1998–2002). Former vice-president of the Progressive Conservative Party of Ontario. Lawyer by profession.
Date candidacy declared: September 28, 2014
Supporters
MPPs: (5) Rick Nicholls (Chatham-Kent—Essex), Jack MacLaren (Carleton—Mississippi Mills), Toby Barrett (Haldimand—Norfolk), Bob Bailey (Sarnia—Lambton), Monte McNaughton (Lambton—Kent—Middlesex; former leadership candidate)
MPs: (18) Gord Brown (Leeds—Grenville), Paul Calandra (Oak Ridges—Markham), Rick Dykstra (St. Catharines), Dave Mackenzie (Oxford), Phil McColeman (Brant), Brad Butt (Mississauga—Streetsville), Chungsen Leung (Willowdale), Tim Uppal (Edmonton—Spruce Grove, AB), Bal Gosal (Bramalea—Gore—Malton), Parm Gill (Brampton—Springdale), Kyle Seeback (Brampton West), Costas Menegakis (Richmond Hill), Mark Adler (York Centre), Wladyslaw Lizon (Mississauga East—Cooksville), Joe Daniel (Don Valley East), Pierre Lemieux (Glengarry—Prescott—Russell), Royal Galipeau (Ottawa—Orléans), Dean Allison (Niagara West—Glanbrook)
Senators: (6) Don Meredith (Ontario), Lynn Beyak (Ontario), Salma Ataullahjan (Ontario), Thanh Hai Ngo (Ontario), Tobias Enverga (Ontario), Victor Oh (Ontario)
Municipal politicians: (6) Sandie Bellow (St. Catherines City Councillor for Ward 5), Scott McPherson (Oro-Medonte City Councillor for Ward 2), Denzil Minnan-Wong (Toronto City Councillor for Ward 34; Deputy Mayor of Toronto), Sergio Morales (Barrie City Councillor for Ward 9), Ross Romano (Sault Ste. Marie City Councillor for Ward 6), Mat Siscoe (St. Catherines City Councillor for Ward 4)
Former MPPs: (4) Steve Gilchrist (Scarborough East, 1995–2003), Jane McKenna (Burlington, 2011–2014), John Hastings (Etobicoke North, 1995–2003), Dave Boushy (Sarnia, 1995–1999)
Former MPs:
Former Senators: (4) Consiglio Di Nino (Ontario), Vim Kochhar (Ontario), Hugh Segal (Ontario), Asha Seth (Ontario)
Former municipal politicians: (2) Joe DiPaola (Richmond Hill City Councillor for Ward 6, 1998–2006), Alex Nuttall (Barrie City Councillor for Ward 10, 2006–2014)
Former candidates: (6) Jeff Bennett (London West, 2014), Andrew Ffrench (York South—Weston, 2014), Kevin Gaudet (Pickering—Scarborough East, 2014), Nita Kang (Scarborough Southwest, 2014), Derek Parks (Thunder Bay—Superior North, 2014), Roxanne Villeneuve (Glengarry—Prescott—Russell, 2014)
Other prominent individuals: (16) Derek Burney (Canadian Ambassador to the United States, 1989–1993), Stuart Clark (Ontario PC Campus Association President, 2013–2014), Troy Crowder (NHL Player), Mike Gartner (NHL Player), Zack Goldford (Ontario PC Youth Association President), Wayne Gretzky (NHL Player), Dale Hawerchuk (NHL Player), Darma Jain (Indo-Canada Chamber of Commerce President), Kris King (NHL Player), Gary Leeman (NHL Player), Narendra Modi (Prime Minister of India), Alanna Newman (Ontario PC Youth Association President, 2013–2014), Laj Prasher (Canada India Foundation President), Mark Towhey (Chief of Staff to the Mayor of Toronto, 2011–2013), Devon White (MLB Player), Ken Zeise (Ontario PC Party President, 2008–2012)
Organizations: 
Media: (1) Paul Godfrey (CEO of Postmedia)
Policies:

Christine Elliott

Background
MPP since 2006 (Whitby—Ajax (2006–2007), Whitby—Oshawa (2007–2015). Deputy Leader of the Opposition and Critic for Health and Long-Term Care since 2009. Ran in the 2009 leadership election, placing third. Widow of former federal Minister of Finance Jim Flaherty. Prior to entering politics, Elliott was a lawyer who practiced corporate, estate and real estate law. 
Date candidacy declared: June 25, 2014
Supporters
MPPs: (17)  Ted Arnott (Wellington—Halton Hills), Todd Smith (Prince Edward—Hastings), Michael Harris (Kitchener—Conestoga), Norm Miller (Parry Sound—Muskoka), Jeff Yurek (Elgin—Middlesex—London), Sylvia Jones (Dufferin—Caledon), Laurie Scott (Haliburton—Kawartha Lakes—Brock), Bill Walker (Bruce—Grey—Owen Sound), Lisa Thompson (Huron—Bruce), Gila Martow (Thornhill), Ernie Hardeman (Oxford), Vic Fedeli (Nipissing; former leadership candidate), Randy Pettapiece (Perth—Wellington), Lisa MacLeod (Nepean—Carleton; former leadership candidate), Steve Clark (Leeds—Grenville), Julia Munro (York—Simcoe), Jim McDonell (Stormont—Dundas—South Glengarry)
MPs: (25)  Chris Alexander (Ajax—Pickering), Bruce Stanton (Simcoe North), Mike Wallace (Burlington), Peter Kent (Thornhill), Erin O'Toole (Durham), Ed Holder (London West), Michael Chong (Wellington—Halton Hills), Rob Nicholson (Niagara Falls), Kellie Leitch (Simcoe—Grey), Chungsen Leung (Willowdale), Costas Menegakis (Richmond Hill), Peter Braid (Kitchener—Waterloo),  Daryl Kramp (Prince Edward—Hastings), Rick Norlock (Northumberland—Quinte West), Ted Opitz (Etobicoke Centre), Joe Preston (Elgin—Middlesex—London), Bernard Trottier (Etobicoke—Lakeshore), Dave Van Kesteren (Chatham-Kent—Essex), Terence Young (Oakville), Pat Perkins (Whitby—Oshawa), David Sweet (Ancaster—Dundas—Flamborough—Westdale), John Baird (Ottawa West—Nepean), John Carmichael (Don Valley West), Lisa Raitt (Halton), Jay Aspin (Nipissing—Timiskaming)
Senators: (3) Nicole Eaton (Ontario), Linda Frum (Ontario), Marjory LeBreton (Ontario)
Municipal politicians: (2) Don Mitchell (Mayor of Whitby), Rob Ford (Toronto City Councillor for Ward 2; Mayor of Toronto, 2010–2014)
Former MPPs: (12) Bill Davis (Premier of Ontario, 1971–1985; MPP 1959–1985), Peter Shurman (Thornhill, 2007–2013), Jerry Ouellette (Oshawa, 1995–2014), Bart Maves (Niagara Falls, 1995–2003), Wayne Wettlaufer (Kitchener Centre, 1995–2003), John O'Toole (Durham, 1995–2014), Barb Fisher (Bruce, 1995–1999), Phil Gillies (Brantford, 1981–1987), Brad Clark (Stoney Creek, 1999–2003), Joyce Savoline (Burlington, 2007–2011), Andy Brandt (Sarnia, 1981–1990; former interim leader), Doug Holyday (Etobicoke—Lakeshore, 2013–2014; former Deputy Mayor of Toronto)
Former MPs:
Former Senators:
Former municipal politicians: (3) Nancy Branscombe (London City Councillor for Ward 6, 2006–2014), Doug Ford (Toronto City Councillor for Ward 2, 2010–2014), Hazel McCallion, (Mayor of Mississauga, 1978–2014)
Former candidates: (10) Steve Black (Timmins—James Bay, 2014), Rick Byers (Oakville, 2011), Liang Chen (Scarborough—Agincourt, 2011 & 2014), Ken Kirupa (Scarborough—Guildwood, 2013 & 2014), Todd McCarthy (Ajax—Pickering, 2011 & 2014), David Ramalho (Scarborough Centre, 2014), Chris Robson (London—Fanshawe, 2014), Larry Scott (Oakville, 2011 & 2014), Farid Wassef (Oak Ridges—Markham, 2011 & 2014), Tracey Weiler (Kitchener—Waterloo, 2012 & 2014)
Other prominent individuals: (1) Sally Barnes (Former Press Secretary to Premier Bill Davis) 
Organizations: 
Media:  
Policies:

Withdrawn

Vic Fedeli

Background
MPP for Nipissing (2011–present), Opposition Finance Critic (2013–present), Energy Critic (2011–2013), Finance Critic (2013–Present), Fedeli served as mayor of North Bay, Ontario (2003–2010) for two terms, during which he donated his entire salary to charity. Before entering politics, he ran Fedeli Advertising, which in 1989 was ranked by Profit - the magazine for Small Business as the firm 34th on its list of 50 Best Places to Work in Canada.  Fedeli was also recognized as one of Canada's Most Successful Entrepreneurs in an episode of MoneyMakers, hosted by Everett Banning.  Additionally, Fedeli served as the dollar-per-year chairman of a non-profit organization in North Bay. Fedeli's campaign is called "OntarioFirst".
Date candidacy declared: September 24, 2014
Date withdrawn: February 4, 2015, endorsed Elliott
Supporters
Support from caucus members: Randy Pettapiece (Perth—Wellington)
Support from federal caucus members: Jay Aspin (Nipissing—Timiskaming)
Support from former provincial caucus members: 
Other prominent supporters: Paula Peroni, 2014 Sudbury  candidate and Sudbury Catholic District School Board trustee;
Policies

Lisa MacLeod
Background
MPP for Nepean—Carleton (2006–present), Opposition Treasury Board Critic (2014–present), Energy and Francophone Affairs Critic (2013–2014), Education Critic (2011–2013), Revenue and Government Accountability Critic (2009–2011).
Date candidacy declared: October 6, 2014
Date withdrawn: February 6, 2015, endorsed Elliott
Supporters
Support from caucus members: Steve Clark (Leeds—Grenville), Garfield Dunlop (Simcoe North), Julia Munro (York—Simcoe), Jim McDonell (Stormont—Dundas—South Glengarry)
Support from federal caucus members: Senator Bob Runciman, former interim PC Leader and cabinet minister, former MPP for Leeds—Grenville
Support from former provincial caucus members: Norm Sterling (Carleton—Mississippi Mills, Lanark—Carleton, Carleton, 1979–2011) 
Other prominent supporters:
Policies:

Monte McNaughton
Background
MPP for Lambton—Kent—Middlesex (2011–present), Opposition Critic for Citizenship, Immigration and International Trade (2014–present), Labour Critic (2013–2014), Economic Development and Innovation Critic (2011–2013). Prior to entering provincial politics, McNaughton sat on the city council of Newbury and was general manager and co-owner of McNaughton Family Shopping Centre in Newbury.  He also served as chair of the Newbury Economic Development Committee and was president of the Strathroy and District Chamber of Commerce in 2009–10.
Date candidacy declared: September 17, 2014
Date withdrawn: April 9, 2015; endorsed Brown.
Supporters
Support from caucus members: Bob Bailey (Sarnia—Lambton)
Supports from federal caucus members:
Supports from former provincial caucus members: Darcy McKeough (Kent West, 1963–1967; Chatham—Kent 1967–1981), Marcel Beaubien, (Lambton then Lambton—Kent—Middlesex, 1995–2003), Andrew Naismith Watson, (Chatham—Kent 1978–1985)
Other prominent supporters: Rob Ford, Toronto city councillor and former mayor (2010–2014)
Policies: Social conservative

Declined
John Baird, Minister of Foreign Affairs (2011–2015) and MP for Ottawa West—Nepean (2006–2015), former MPP (1995–2005) and provincial cabinet minister (1999–2003). Endorsed Elliott
Rick Byers, Bay Street executive (Borealis Infrastructure) and former federal and provincial candidate in Oakville. Endorsed Elliott
Michael Chong, MP for Wellington—Halton Hills (2004–present), federal Minister of Intergovernmental Affairs, President of the Queen's Privy Council for Canada, and Minister of Sport (2006). Endorsed Elliott
Richard Ciano, President of the Progressive Conservative Party of Ontario (2012–2015).
Tony Clement, federal President of the Treasury Board (2011–2015) and MP for Parry Sound—Muskoka (2006–present), former MPP (1995–2003) and provincial cabinet minister (1997–2003).
Rick Dykstra, MP for St. Catharines (2006–2015). Endorsed Brown.
Doug Ford, Toronto City Councillor (2010–2014), and runner-up 2014 Toronto mayoral election. Endorsed Elliott
Randy Hillier, MPP for Lanark—Frontenac—Lennox and Addington (2007–present). 
Kellie Leitch, federal Minister of Labour (2013–2015) and MP for Simcoe—Grey (2011–present). Endorsed Elliott
Rod Phillips, former chair of the Ontario Lottery and Gaming Corporation, chair of Postmedia Network Inc. and the Greater Toronto CivicAction Alliance.
Lisa Raitt, federal Minister of Transport (2013–2015) and MP for Halton (2008–present). Endorsed Elliott

Results

Results announced in Toronto on May 9, 2015

Eligible voters: 76,587; turnout: 49.3%

Riding results

Opinion polling

All Ontarians

Progressive Conservative supporters only

Progressive Conservative Members Only

See also
Progressive Conservative Party of Ontario leadership elections
2009 Progressive Conservative Party of Ontario leadership election

References

2015
Progressive Conservative Party of Ontario leadership election
Progressive Conservative Party of Ontario leadership election
Progressive Conservative Party leadership election
Progressive Conservative Party of Ontario leadership election